Ajqan (also Romanized as Ajqān and Ajghān) is a village in Rezqabad Rural District, in the Central District of Esfarayen County, North Khorasan Province, Iran. At the 2006 census, its population was 513, in 139 families.

References 

Populated places in Esfarayen County